Sphoeroides nitidus is a species in the family Tetraodontidae, the pufferfishes. It is native to the Southwest Pacific, where it is known from New Zealand.

References

Tetraodontidae
Fish described in 1921